Ove Pedersen (born 30 August 1954) is a Danish football manager and a former player. He works as an assistant to the sporting director in FC Midtjylland, Svend Graversen.

He previously managed FC Midtjylland and Esbjerg fB to bronze medals in the Danish Superliga. He was the manager of Danish club AGF until 31 December, on 1 January 2009 he returned as manager at Esbjerg fB, but resigned on 14 March 2011. From 2011 to 2014 he was the manager of FC Vestsjælland. Ove Pedersen was sacked as manager of Hobro IK in November 2016, as the club was leading the Danish Division 1.

References

External links
 AGF profile
 Ove Pedersen Interview

1954 births
Living people
Danish men's footballers
Association football defenders
Ikast FS players
FC Midtjylland managers
Esbjerg fB managers
Aarhus Gymnastikforening managers
Danish football managers
Odense Boldklub managers
FC Fredericia managers
Danish Superliga managers
FC Vestsjælland managers
Danish 1st Division managers